The 14th Legislative Assembly of Saskatchewan was elected in the Saskatchewan general election held in June 1960. The assembly sat from February 9, 1961, to March 18, 1964. The Co-operative Commonwealth Federation (CCF) led by Tommy Douglas formed the government. Woodrow Lloyd became Premier and CCF party leader in November 1961 after Douglas became leader of the federal New Democratic Party. The Liberal Party led by Ross Thatcher formed the official opposition.

Everett Irvine Wood served as speaker for the assembly until 1962. Frederick Arthur Dewhurst succeeded Wood as speaker.

Members of the Assembly 
The following members were elected to the assembly in 1960:

Notes:

Party Standings 

Notes:

By-elections 
By-elections were held to replace members for various reasons:

Notes:

References 

Terms of the Saskatchewan Legislature